Finnish regional road 132, or Loppi Road is the road between Highway 3 (E12) and Highway 54, which starts at the southern end from the border of Vantaa and Nurmijärvi and at the northern end starts in the municipality of Loppi, right next to the church village of Loppi. The road is paved, dual lane and 52 miles long. Back in the late 1950s, it was the original main road before the current freeway, and in addition to passing through Loppi, it continued through the remote forest areas of Janakkala all the way to Hämeenlinna. And before the completion of the current Finnish national road 2, it also served the traffic of Forssa and Pori, which passed through Loppi and Tammela.

In November 2020, a new road alignment was completed on the road around the northern part of Nurmijärvi's Klaukkala, before which the old alignment passed through the center of Klaukkala. The new bypass is known as the Klaukkala Ring Road.

Route 
 Vantaa
 Nurmijärvi
 Klaukkala
 Perttula
 Röykkä
 Vihti
 Vihtijärvi
 Loppi
 Läyliäinen
 Loppi

See also
 Vihdintie

References

External links 

 
 

Roads in Finland